Star X is a rail shooter video game developed by Graphic State and published by BAM! Entertainment for the Game Boy Advance handheld video game console. It was first released in North America on April 17, 2002, and later was released in the PAL regions on May 17, 2002.

Gameplay

Star X is a rail shooter video game.

Development
Star X was developed by Graphic State and published by BAM! Entertainment. The game was first announced in 2001 under the name Star Fight. Graphic State's creative director Richard Whittall cited 1993's Star Fox as an influence to the development of the game, while mentioning the gameplay to be different from the Super Nintendo Entertainment System game.

Reception

Star X received "mixed" reviews according to the review aggregation website Metacritic. Craig Harris of IGN called it "terrible" and "frustrating".

Play Magazine called it the best Shooter for the Game Boy Advance, calling it one of the best GBA games of 2002 and the best polygonal game ever.

References

External links
 

2002 video games
Game Boy Advance games
Game Boy Advance-only games
Graphic State games
Multiplayer and single-player video games
Rail shooters
Video games developed in the United Kingdom